The 1992 NCAA Division I-A football season was the first year of the Bowl Coalition and concluded with Alabama's first national championship in thirteen years—their first since the departure of Bear Bryant.  One of Bryant's former players, Gene Stallings, was the head coach, and he used a style similar to Bryant's, a smashmouth running game combined with a tough defense.

The top-tier games of the Bowl Coalition were the Sugar Bowl, Orange Bowl, Cotton Bowl Classic, and Fiesta Bowl.  Under the agreement, the Sugar Bowl, Orange Bowl, and Cotton Bowl Classic hosted the Southeastern Conference, Big 8, and Southwest Conference champions, respectively, and then a pool of at large teams was formed between the Atlantic Coast Conference champ, the Big East champ, Notre Dame, and two conference runners-up from the Big 8, SWC, ACC, Big East and Pac-10. The highest ranked host team would play the highest ranked at-large team.  If the two highest ranked teams were both at-large teams, the championship game would be hosted by the Fiesta Bowl. Three other bowls—the Blockbuster Bowl, Gator Bowl, and John Hancock Bowl—were second-tier games of the Bowl Coalition.

For this year, (host) SEC champ Alabama played (at-large) Big East Champ Miami-FL, the Orange Bowl featured (host) Big-8 champ Nebraska and (at-large) ACC champ Florida St., the Cotton Bowl Classic featured (host) SWC champ Texas A&M and (at-large) independent Notre Dame, and the Fiesta Bowl featured (at-large) Big East runner up Syracuse and (at-large) Big 8 runner up Colorado.

The 1992 season also saw the expansion of the SEC and the first conference championship game to be played in the country. Before the 1992 season, the Arkansas Razorbacks and the South Carolina Gamecocks joined the SEC, which expanded the conference to twelve teams. The conference then split into two divisions, and the winner of each division would face off in the SEC Championship Game in Birmingham's historic Legion Field (later moved to Atlanta's Georgia Dome, in 1994). In the first year of the new system, Alabama won the SEC West, Florida won the SEC East, and the Tide won the match-up 28–21 on an Antonio Langham interception return for a touchdown in the closing minutes.

In the Sugar Bowl, to decide the national champion, Miami came in a heavy favorite with even heavier swagger. The Tide defense, however, with its eleven-man fronts and zone blitzes, heavily confused Heisman Trophy winner Gino Torretta and Alabama won in a defensive rout, 34–13.

In other circles, the Big West Conference lost two members; Fresno State left for the WAC and Long Beach State stopped sponsoring football, but they also gained a member in Nevada, which made the jump from Division I-AA.  Nevada went 5–1 in conference, winning the Big West championship and representing the conference in the 1992 Las Vegas Bowl (formerly the California Bowl held in Fresno, California).

Rule changes
 Fumbles could now be recovered and advanced by the defense anywhere on the field (previously it only applied to fumbles beyond the line of scrimmage), except for backward passes and muffed punts/kickoffs, which could be recovered by the defense but not advanced.
 Today, the defense is still not allowed to advance muffed kicks, but has been allowed to advance backward passes since 1998.
 While overtime was not introduced for regular-season games until 1996 (and Division I-A bowl games in 1995), the Kansas tiebreaker procedure was permitted (but not needed) for the SEC Championship Game beginning in 1992. Both teams would be allowed a chance to score by beginning their drive at the opponent's 25-yard-line.

Conference and program changes
Florida State played its first season of ACC football in 1992 after many years as an independent. The Seminoles had joined the ACC in all other sports in 1991.
Arkansas and the South Carolina joined the SEC, expanding the conference to twelve teams. Both the Razorbacks and the Gamecocks had joined the SEC in all other sports in 1991.
Akron joined the Mid-American Conference.
Fresno State departed the  Big West for the WAC and were replaced by Nevada, formerly of Division I-AA.
Long Beach State dropped its football program, which had been a member of the Big West.

Regular season

September
Miami and Washington, the co-champions of the 1991 season, were again ranked No. 1 and No. 2 in the preseason poll for 1992. They were followed by No. 3 Notre Dame, No. 4 Florida, and No. 5 Florida State. None of the top five teams had started their schedule by the time the second poll was taken, but the AP voters dropped Florida to No. 6 behind No. 4 Florida State and No. 5 Michigan.

September 5: No. 1 Miami won 24-7 at No. 23 Iowa, No. 2 Washington visited Arizona State for a 31-7 win, and No. 3 Notre Dame beat Northwestern 42-7 in Chicago. No. 4 Florida State, playing their first year in the ACC after having previously been an independent, defeated Duke 48-21. Neither No. 5 Michigan nor No. 6 Florida had started their schedules, but the voters shuffled them again in the next poll: No. 1 Miami, No. 2 Washington, No. 3 Notre Dame, No. 4 Florida, and No. 5 Florida State, with Michigan dropping to sixth.

September 12: No. 1 Miami was idle. No. 2 Washington defeated Wisconsin 27-10. No. 3 Notre Dame played No. 6 Michigan to a 17-17 tie; the Irish came back from a 10-point fourth-quarter deficit but ran out of time on their final drive. No. 4 Florida started their season with a 35-19 win over Kentucky, and No. 5 Florida State edged No. 15 Clemson 24-20. No. 7 Texas A&M beat Tulsa 19-9 and moved into the top five in the next poll: No. 1 Miami, No. 2 Washington, No. 3 Florida State, No. 4 Florida, and No. 5 Texas A&M.

September 19: No. 1 Miami shut out Florida A&M 38-0, No. 2 Washington beat No. 12 Nebraska 29-14, and No. 3 Florida State won 34-13 at No. 16 North Carolina State. No. 4 Florida fell 31-14 at No. 14 Tennessee, while No. 5 Texas A&M visited Missouri for a 26-13 victory and No. 6 Michigan defeated Oklahoma State 35-3. The top five in the next poll were No. 1 Miami, No. 2 Washington, No. 3 Florida State, No. 4 Michigan, and No. 5 Texas A&M.

September 26: No. 1 Miami barely escaped Arizona, coming away with an 8-7 victory only when the Wildcats missed a field goal with time running out. No. 2 Washington and No. 5 Texas A&M were idle. No. 3 Florida State defeated Wake Forest 35-7, and No. 4 Michigan overwhelmed Houston 61-7. Miami’s close call led the AP voters to drop them out of first place in the next poll: No. 1 Washington, No. 2 Miami, No. 3 Florida State, No. 4 Michigan, and No. 5 Texas A&M.

October
October 3: No. 1 Washington beat No. 20 USC 17-10, with the key play being a late-game interception in the end zone. The game between No. 2 Miami and No. 3 Florida State was remarkably similar to their matchup from the previous year. Despite being held without an offensive touchdown, the Seminoles led 16-10 in the fourth quarter (they had returned the opening kickoff for a TD and kicked three field goals), but the Hurricanes drove for a touchdown and later increased their lead to 19-16 by forcing a safety. Florida State got the ball back with 95 seconds left and drove to the Miami 22-yard line, but for the second year in a row their kicker’s field goal attempt went wide right as time ran out. No. 4 Michigan defeated Iowa 52-28. No. 5 Texas A&M’s game also came down to a last-second field goal, but this time the kick was successful in delivering the Aggies a 19-17 win over Texas Tech. No. 7 Tennessee shut out LSU 20-0 and moved up in the next poll: No. 1 Washington, No. 2 Miami, No. 3 Michigan, No. 4 Tennessee, and No. 5 Texas A&M.

October 10: No. 1 Washington defeated No. 24 California 35-16, No. 2 Miami survived a third straight close game with a 17-14 win at No. 7 Penn State, and No. 3 Michigan beat Michigan State 35-10. No. 4 Tennessee held a commanding lead over Arkansas with a few minutes left, but the Razorbacks (playing their first season in the SEC after moving from their longtime home in the SWC) scored a touchdown, recovered an onside kick, and converted a game-ending field goal for a 25-24 victory. No. 5 Texas A&M was idle, while No. 6 Alabama shut out Tulane 37-0. For the third time in four weeks, Texas A&M was jumped by a lower-ranked team which had pulled off an impressive win: No. 1 Washington, No. 2 Miami, No. 3 Michigan, No. 4 Alabama, and No. 5 Texas A&M.

October 17: No. 1 Washington won 24-3 at Oregon. No. 2 Miami finally had an easy victory, 45-10 over TCU. No. 3 Michigan beat Indiana 31-3, No. 4 Alabama defeated No. 13 Tennessee 17-10 thanks to a late-game interception, and No. 5 Texas A&M won 35-9 over Rice. Washington and Miami tied for No. 1 in the next poll, with the following three teams remaining the same.

October 24: No. 1 Washington beat Pacific 31-7, while fellow No. 1 Miami won 43-23 at Virginia Tech. No. 3 Michigan defeated Minnesota 63-13, No. 4 Alabama won 31-10 over Mississippi, and No. 5 Texas A&M had a controversial 19-13 win over Baylor (a first-quarter Baylor touchdown was nullified on a disputed call, and the Bears later lost the opportunity to kick a field goal when the operator failed to stop the clock after an incomplete pass). Miami was elevated to the sole No. 1 spot in the next poll, with Washington falling to No. 2 and the other teams remaining the same.

October 31: No. 1 Miami defeated West Virginia 35-23, No. 2 Washington beat No. 15 Stanford 41-7, and No. 3 Michigan won 24-17 at Purdue. No. 4 Alabama was idle, and No. 5 Texas A&M was a 41-7 victor at SMU. The AP voters shuffled the order of the top teams in the next poll: No. 1 Washington, No. 2 Miami, No. 3 Alabama, No. 4 Michigan, and No. 5 Texas A&M.

November-December
November 7: No. 1 Washington visited No. 12 Arizona, the same team which had nearly upset Miami six weeks earlier. The Huskies were not so fortunate, falling 16-3. No. 2 Miami was idle. No. 3 Alabama won 31-11 at LSU, No. 4 Michigan went to Northwestern for a 40-7 win, No. 5 Texas A&M beat Louisville 40-18, and No. 6 Florida State moved back into the top five with a 69-21 defeat of Maryland: No. 1 Miami, No. 2 Alabama, No. 3 Michigan, No. 4 Texas A&M, and No. 5 Florida State.

November 12-14: No. 1 Miami shut out Temple 48-0. No. 2 Alabama won 30-21 at No. 16 Mississippi State, clinching the SEC Western Division title and a berth in the conference’s first-ever championship game. Having already tied Notre Dame in their first game of the season, No. 3 Michigan repeated the process with a 22-22 deadlock against Illinois. Nevertheless, the Wolverines were far enough ahead in the Big Ten standings to clinch the conference title and a Rose Bowl berth. No. 4 Texas A&M beat Houston 38-30, and No. 5 Florida State overwhelmed Tulane 70-7. No. 6 Washington beat Oregon State 45-16, earning the Pac-10 crown and a bowl matchup with Michigan. The next poll featured No. 1 Miami, No. 2 Alabama, No. 3 Florida State, No. 4 Texas A&M, and No. 5 Washington.

November 21: No. 1 Miami held No. 8 Syracuse to negative-one offensive yards in the first half. The Orangemen mounted a comeback, but the Hurricanes came away with a 16-10 win when a Syracuse receiver was tackled at the Miami 3-yard line as time ran out. No. 2 Alabama and No. 3 Florida State were idle. No. 4 Texas A&M clinched the SWC title and a Cotton Bowl berth with a 37-10 victory over TCU, but No. 5 Washington finished their season with a 42-23 loss at Washington State. No. 6 Michigan closed their year with yet another tie (13-13 at No. 17 Ohio State), giving idle No. 7 Notre Dame the opportunity to move up in the next poll: No. 1 Miami, No. 2 Alabama, No. 3 Florida State, No. 4 Texas A&M, and No. 5 Notre Dame.

November 26-28: No. 1 Miami wrapped up an undefeated regular season with a 63-17 win at San Diego State, No. 2 Alabama shut out Auburn 17-0, No. 3 Florida State beat No. 6 Florida 45-24, No. 4 Texas A&M won 34-13 at Texas, and No. 5 Notre Dame visited No. 19 USC for a 31-23 victory. The top five remained the same in the next poll.

College football’s first-ever conference championship game was played on December 5, when No. 2 Alabama met No. 12 Florida for the SEC title and a Sugar Bowl berth. The Gators came back from a 14-point deficit to tie the game in the fourth quarter, but an interception return for a touchdown sealed a 28-21 Alabama victory. Thus, the Crimson Tide would face No. 1 Miami for the national championship. No. 3 Florida State would play in the Orange Bowl against No. 11 Nebraska, the Big 8 champion. No. 4 Texas A&M was undefeated and untied, but their relatively light schedule took them out of championship contention; they would face No. 5 Notre Dame in the Cotton Bowl. The major postseason matchups were rounded out by No. 6 Syracuse against No. 10 Colorado in the Fiesta Bowl and No. 7 Michigan against No. 9 Washington in the Rose Bowl.

Conference standings

No. 1 and No. 2 progress
Until the November 10, 1992, poll, No. 1 and No. 2 shifted between Miami and Seattle, as the Miami Hurricanes and the Washington Huskies were only points apart at the top.  In the preseason poll, Miami had 40 of the 62 first place votes cast, and Washington 12.  After both teams went 5–0, they each got first place votes from 31 electors, split 31½ each, and on October 13, the Huskies were ahead by a single point 1,517½ to 1,516½.  The following week, there was a tie for first place for the first time in the history of the AP poll, with Miami and Washington each collecting 1,517 points (Miami had more first place votes, 31 to 30, as another writer went with 7–0–0 Alabama).  The next week, Miami was ahead 1,517 to 1,516, and the week after, Washington was on top again.  On November 7, the Huskies lost at Arizona, 16–3 to fall to 8–1–0.  In the remaining polls, Miami was the clear cut favorite for No. 1, with 61 of the 62 votes, and Alabama was everyone's favorite No. 2.  Both finished the regular season unbeaten.  Since Miami was an "at-large" school, and Alabama was the highest ranked of the "host schools" (qualifying for the Sugar Bowl as the Southeastern Conference champion), the No. 1 vs. No. 2 matchup would take place in New Orleans.

Bowl games

Final rankings

Final AP Poll
Alabama
Florida State
Miami (FL)
Notre Dame
Michigan
Syracuse
Texas A&M
Georgia
Stanford
Florida
Washington
Tennessee
Colorado
Nebraska
Washington State
Mississippi
N.C. State
Ohio State
North Carolina
Hawaii
Boston College
Kansas
Mississippi State
Fresno State
Wake Forest

Final Coaches Poll
Alabama
Florida State
Miami (FL)
Notre Dame
Michigan
Texas A&M
Syracuse
Georgia
Stanford
Washington
Florida
Tennessee
Colorado
Nebraska
N.C. State
Mississippi
Washington State
North Carolina
Ohio State
Hawaii
Boston College
Fresno State
Kansas
Penn State
Wake Forest

Awards and honors

Heisman Trophy
The Heisman Memorial Trophy Award is given to the Most Outstanding Player of the year.

Winner: Gino Torretta, Miami-FL, Sr. QB (1400 votes)
2. Marshall Faulk, San Diego State, So. RB (1080 votes)
3. Garrison Hearst, Georgia, Jr. RB (982 votes)
4. Marvin Jones, Florida State, Jr. LB (392 votes)
5. Reggie Brooks, Notre Dame, Sr. RB (294 votes)

Other major awards
Maxwell Award (College Player of the Year) - Gino Torretta, Miami-FL
Walter Camp Award (Back) - Gino Torretta
Davey O'Brien Award (Quarterback) - Gino Torretta
Doak Walker Award (Running Back) - Garrison Hearst, Georgia
Dick Butkus Award (Linebacker) - Marvin Jones, Florida State
Lombardi Award (Lineman or Linebacker) - Marvin Jones, Florida State
Outland Trophy (Interior Lineman) - Will Shields, Nebraska
Jim Thorpe Award (Defensive Back) - Deon Figures, Colorado
AFCA Coach of the Year - Gene Stallings, Alabama 
Paul "Bear" Bryant Coach of the Year - Gene Stallings, Alabama

Coaching changes

In-season

References